Meyvəli is a village and the least populous municipality in the Yevlakh Rayon of Azerbaijan.  It has a population of 227.

References 

Populated places in Yevlakh District